Girraween is an undeveloped locality in the Southern Downs Region, Queensland, Australia. It is in the Granite Belt and on the border with New South Wales.

Geography
The terrain is in the Granite Belt and is mountainous with peaks including (from north to south) Slip Rock , The Pyramids , Castle Rock , Billy Goat Hill , Twin Peaks , Sphix , Turtle Rock , Mount Norman , Middle Rock  and West Bald Rock . The entire locality is undeveloped and within the Girraween National Park.

History 
The locality was named and bounded on 15 December 2000. It presumably takes its name from the national park.

References 

Southern Downs Region
Localities in Queensland